Ligonier Armory was a historic National Guard armory located at Ligonier, Westmoreland County, Pennsylvania.  It was built in 1937-1938 as a Public Works Administration sponsored project, and was a "T"-shaped brick building executed in the Art Deco style. The two-story front section housed the drill hall, with a one-story administrative section in the rear.  Additions were completed in 1962 and 1972.

It was added to the National Register of Historic Places in 1991.  The armory was demolished in the late 2000s, and the site redeveloped with residences.

References

Armories on the National Register of Historic Places in Pennsylvania
Art Deco architecture in Pennsylvania
Infrastructure completed in 1938
Buildings and structures in Westmoreland County, Pennsylvania
National Register of Historic Places in Westmoreland County, Pennsylvania